Mikael Löfgren (born 2 September 1969) is a former Swedish biathlete. He became the Junior World Champion in 1986, aged 17. At the 1992 Olympics in Albertville, France, he won two bronze medals, one in the 4 × 7.5 km relay and one in the 20 km individual. His teammates with the Swedish relay team were Ulf Johansson, Tord Wiksten, and Leif Andersson. The next season, he won the overall Biathlon World Cup.

Löfgren coached Norway's biathlon team from 2008 to 2012.

Biathlon results
All results are sourced from the International Biathlon Union.

Olympic Games
2 medals (2 bronze)

World Championships

*During Olympic seasons competitions are only held for those events not included in the Olympic program.
**Pursuit was added as an event in 1997.

References

External links
 

1969 births
Living people
Swedish male biathletes
Biathletes at the 1988 Winter Olympics
Biathletes at the 1992 Winter Olympics
Biathletes at the 1994 Winter Olympics
Biathletes at the 1998 Winter Olympics
Olympic biathletes of Sweden
Medalists at the 1992 Winter Olympics
Olympic medalists in biathlon
Olympic bronze medalists for Sweden
People from Torsby Municipality
20th-century Swedish people